John Daniell may refer to:
John Frederic Daniell (1790–1845), English chemist and physicist
John Daniell (sportsman) (1878–1963), English cricketer and international rugby union player
John Daniell (rugby union) (born 1972), New Zealand rugby player

See also
John Daniel (disambiguation)